Misael Uziel Rodríguez Olivas (born 7 April 1994) is a Mexican professional boxer.

Career
He won a bronze medal at the 2016 Summer Olympics.

Rodríguez competed in the World Series of Boxing between 2014 and 2016. He wasn't successful, losing 9 of 12 bouts and being TKO'd by Arlen López in a May 2016 fight. Rodríguez won a bronze medal at the 2015 Pan American Games, beating Anthony Campbell before losing to Jorge Vivas in the semi-finals.

He competed in the men's middleweight event at the 2016 Summer Olympics. Rodríguez won three bouts before losing to silver medalist Bektemir Melikuziev in the semi-finals, winning a bronze medal.

In 2017, he turned professional, signing with Richard Schaefer. Rodríguez's manager is former Olympian and world champion Abner Mares.

Rodríguez's cousin is UFC fighter Yair Rodríguez.

Professional boxing record

Notes

References

External links
 
 
 
 

1994 births
Living people
Mexican male boxers
Olympic boxers of Mexico
Olympic bronze medalists for Mexico
Boxers at the 2016 Summer Olympics
Medalists at the 2016 Summer Olympics
Olympic medalists in boxing
Pan American Games bronze medalists for Mexico
Boxers at the 2015 Pan American Games
Boxers from Chihuahua (state)
Pan American Games medalists in boxing
Central American and Caribbean Games silver medalists for Mexico
Competitors at the 2014 Central American and Caribbean Games
Middleweight boxers
Central American and Caribbean Games medalists in boxing
Medalists at the 2015 Pan American Games